Grover M. Moscowitz (August 31, 1886 – March 31, 1947) was a United States district judge of the United States District Court for the Eastern District of New York.

Education and career

Born in Hot Springs, Arkansas, Moscowitz received a Bachelor of Laws from New York University School of Law in 1906. He was in private practice of law in Brooklyn, New York from 1907 to 1925. He was a special deputy state attorney general of New York from 1909 to 1910 and from 1922 to 1925.

Federal judicial service

Moscowitz was nominated by President Calvin Coolidge on December 16, 1925, to a seat on the United States District Court for the Eastern District of New York vacated by Judge Edwin Louis Garvin. He was confirmed by the United States Senate on December 21, 1925, and received his commission the same day. His service was terminated on March 31, 1947, due to his death in New York City, New York.

See also
List of Jewish American jurists

References

Sources
 

Judges of the United States District Court for the Eastern District of New York
United States district court judges appointed by Calvin Coolidge
20th-century American judges
1886 births
1947 deaths
New York University School of Law alumni
People from Hot Springs, Arkansas